Shuna Harwood (born 1940) is a British costume designer. She was nominated at the 68th Academy Awards for the film Richard III in the category of  Best Costumes.

She won a BAFTA award for her work on Richard III.

Filmography

Firewall (2006)
Bride of the Wind (2001)
Notting Hill (1999)
The Land Girls (1998)
Passion in the Desert (1998)
Richard III (1995)
The Dwelling Place (1994) (Mini-series) 
Double Vision (1992) (TV movie)
 (1991)
Track 29 (1988)
Aria (1987)
Personal Services (1987)
Wish You Were Here (1987)
Insignificance (1985)
Sword of the Valiant: The Legend of Sir Gawain and the Green Knight (1984)
Brimstone & Treacle (1982)
The Missionary (1982)
Bad Timing: A Sensual Obsession (1980) (additional costumes)
The Odd Job (1978)
The Haunting of Julia (1977)

References

External links

1940 births
Living people
British costume designers
Best Costume Design BAFTA Award winners
Women costume designers